Kristian Thorstvedt (born 13 March 1999) is a Norwegian professional footballer who plays as an attacking midfielder for Serie A club Sassuolo and the Norway national team.

Career

Early career
On 1 February 2018, Thorstvedt signed a one and a half year contract with Viking. He was awarded young player of the season in the 2018 1. divisjon.

Genk
On 3 January 2020, he signed a three and a half year contract with Genk.

On 4 March 2021, Thorstvedt netted a brace in Genk's 4–1 defeat of Mechelen in the quarter-final stage of the Belgian Cup. Genk would eventually go on to beat Standard Liège in the final to win the domestic cup for the fifth time in club history. On 20 May 2021, Thorstvedt scored a hat-trick in a 4–0 league win over Royal Antwerp. On 28 April 2022, Genk announced that they had extended Thorstvedt's contract, keeping him with the club through the end of the 2024-25 season.

Sassuolo 
On 12 July 2022, Sassuolo announced the signing of Thorsrvedt from Genk, on  a five year contract.

Personal life
Kristian Thorstvedt is the son of former goalkeeper Erik Thorstvedt.

Career statistics

Club

International

Scores and results list Norway's goal tally first, score column indicates score after each Thorstvedt goal.

Honours
Viking
 Norwegian Football Cup: 2019
 Norwegian First Division: 2018

Genk
Belgian Cup: 2020–21

Individual
 Norwegian First Division Young Player of the Season: 2018

References

1999 births
Living people
Sportspeople from Stavanger
Norwegian footballers
Association football midfielders
Norway international footballers
Norway under-21 international footballers
Norway youth international footballers
Eliteserien players
Norwegian First Division players
Norwegian Third Division players
Belgian Pro League players
Serie A players
Viking FK players
K.R.C. Genk players
U.S. Sassuolo Calcio players
Norwegian expatriate footballers
Norwegian expatriate sportspeople in Belgium
Expatriate footballers in Belgium
Norwegian expatriate sportspeople in Italy
Expatriate footballers in Italy